Typhonium jinpingense, common name "artist's aroid," is a plant species native to Jingping County, Yunnan Province, China.

Typhonium jinpingense is a deciduous perennial herb with a tuberous rhizome. Chromosome number: 2n=10.

References

flora of Yunnan
jinpingense
Plants described in 2002